The list of shipwrecks in March 1835 includes ships sunk, foundered, wrecked, grounded or otherwise lost during March 1835.

1 March

2 March

3 March

4 March

5 March

6 March

7 March

9 March

10 March

11 March

12 March

14 March

15 March

16 March

17 March

18 March

19 March

24 March

26 March

27 March

28 March

29 March

31 March

Unknown date

References

1835-03